The 2000 Grand Prix de Denain was the 42nd edition of the Grand Prix de Denain cycle race and was held on 20 April 2000. The race was won by Endrio Leoni.

General classification

References

2000
2000 in road cycling
2000 in French sport
April 2000 sports events in France